Bonnetia bolivarensis is a species of flowering plant in the Bonnetiaceae family.
It is found only in Venezuela, known only from a single locality in the summit savanna of Ptari-tepui, in Canaima National Park in Bolívar.

References

Endemic flora of Venezuela
Vulnerable plants
bolivarensis
Taxonomy articles created by Polbot
Plants described in 1987
Flora of the Tepuis